NACHT, LRR and PYD domains-containing protein 12 is a protein that in humans is encoded by the NLRP12 gene.

NALPs are cytoplasmic proteins that form a subfamily within the larger CATERPILLER protein family. Most short NALPs, such as NALP12, have an N-terminal pyrin (MEFV; MIM 608107) domain (PYD), followed by a NACHT domain, a NACHT-associated domain (NAD), and a C-terminal leucine-rich repeat (LRR) region. The long NALP, NALP1 (MIM 606636), also has a C-terminal extension containing a function to find domain (FIIND) and a caspase recruitment domain (CARD). NALPs are implicated in the activation of proinflammatory caspases (e.g., CASP1; MIM 147678) via their involvement in multiprotein complexes called inflammasomes (Tschopp et al., 2003).[supplied by OMIM]

References

Further reading

 

LRR proteins
NOD-like receptors